Richard Grant Teale (born 27 February 1952 in Millom, Cumbria) is an English former professional footballer who played in the Football League, as a goalkeeper.

References

Sources

1952 births
Living people
People from Millom
English footballers
Association football goalkeepers
Walton & Hersham F.C. players
Queens Park Rangers F.C. players
Fulham F.C. players
Wimbledon F.C. players
Slough Town F.C. players
Carshalton Athletic F.C. players
Staines Town F.C. players
English Football League players
Footballers from Cumbria